Pesce Peninsula is a broad snow-covered peninsula lying between Rameau Inlet and Verdi Inlet on the north side of the Beethoven Peninsula, situated in the southwest portion of Alexander Island, Antarctica. Dykeman Point is the main and only headland on Pesce Peninsula marking the northern extremity of the peninsula. Photographed from the air by Ronne Antarctic Research Expedition (RARE), 1947–48, and mapped from these photographs by D. Searle of Falkland Islands Dependencies Survey (FIDS), 1960. Named by Advisory Committee on Antarctic Names (US-ACAN) for Commander Victor L. Pesce, U.S. Navy, Commanding Officer, U.S. Navy Antarctic Development Squadron Six (VXE-6), from May 1980 to May 1981. Pesce Peninsula is one of the eight peninsulas of Alexander Island.

See also 

 Beethoven Peninsula
 Harris Peninsula
 Monteverdi Peninsula

Further reading 
  Jane G. Ferrigno, Alison J. Cook, Amy M. Mathie, Richard S. Williams, Jr., Charles Swithinbank, Kevin M. Foley, Adrian J. Fox, Janet W. Thomson, and Jörn Sievers,  Coastal-Change and Glaciological Map of the Palmer Land Area, Antarctica: 1947–2009 , U.S. Geological Survey Geologic Investigations Series Map I–2600–C, 1 map sheet, 28-p

External links 

 Pesce Peninsula on USGS website
 Pesce Peninsula on AADC website
 Pesce Peninsula on SCAR website
 Pesce Peninsula on marineregions.org
 Current weather on Pesce Peninsula
 Long term weather forecast for Pesce Peninsula
 Pesce Peninsula historical weather data

References 

Peninsulas of Alexander Island